Systems for naming or numbering vacuum tubes include:

 Mullard–Philips tube designation
 RMA tube designation
 RETMA tube designation
 Russian tube designations